Each team's roster consisted of at least 15 skaters (forwards and defencemen) and two goaltenders, and at most 22 skaters and three goaltenders. All 16 participating nations, through the confirmation of their respective national associations, had to submit a roster by the first IIHF directorate meeting.

Age and team as of 5 May 2017.

Group A

Denmark
A 24-player roster was announced on 24 March 2017. The roster was 27 on 18 April 2017. On 25 April 2017, it was reduced to 24 players.

Head coach: Janne Karlsson

Germany
A 26-player roster was announced on 17 April 2017. The roster was renewed to 27 players on 26 April 2017. The final squad was revealed on 2 May 2017.

Head coach: Marco Sturm

Italy
A 25-player roster was announced on 6 April 2017. A renewed 27-player roster was revealed on 24 April 2017. The final roster was set on 30 April 2017.

Head coach: Stefan Mair

Latvia
A 22-player roster was announced on 15 April 2017. On 22 April 2017, it was renewed. A 28-player roster was announced on 27 April 2017. The final roster was revealed on 2 May 2017.

Head coach: Bob Hartley

Russia
A 27-player roster was announced on 25 April 2017.
It was 28 players on 2 May 2017. One day later, the final roster was set.

Head coach: Oleg Znarok

Slovakia
A 22-player roster was announced on 31 March 2017. It was 26 players on 25 April 2017. The final roster was revealed on 2 May 2017.

Head coach: Zdeno Cíger

Sweden
A 23-player roster was announced on 16 April 2017. It was 26 players on 27 April 2017. On 28 April 2017, 25 players remained on the roster. The final squad was revealed on 1 May 2017.

Head coach: Rikard Grönborg

United States
A 15-player roster was named on 13 April 2017, and a day later, Noah Hanifin and Clayton Keller were added. Jack Eichel was added on 19 April, while Johnny Gaudreau was added on 21 April and Charlie McAvoy and Trevor van Riemsdyk on 26 April. On 27 April, Nick Schmaltz was added.

Head coach: Jeff Blashill

Group B

Belarus
A 30-player roster was announced on 27 March 2017. It was trimmed to 26 on 14 April 2017. The final roster was revealed on 2 May 2017.

Head Coach: Dave Lewis

Canada
An 18-player roster was named on 19 April 2017. On 28 April 2017 Marc-Édouard Vlasic, Brayden Schenn, Mitch Marner, and Chad Johnson were added, to bring the roster to 22 players.

Head coach: Jon Cooper

Czech Republic
A 31-player roster was announced on 14 April 2017. On 22 April 2017, it was reduced to 29. The roster was set to 27 on 30 April 2017.

Head coach: Josef Jandač

Finland
A 26-player roster was announced on 9 April 2017. It was renewed to 27 on 23 April 2017. The final roster was revealed on 1 May 2017.

Head coach: Lauri Marjamäki

France
A 23-player roster was announced on 5 April 2017. A new 25-player roster was revealed on 24 April 2017. The final roster was set on 2 May 2017.

Head coach: Dave Henderson

Norway
A 26-player roster was announced on 14 April 2017. It was reduced to 24 on 27 April 2017. The final roster was set on 3 May 2017.

Head coach: Petter Thoresen

Slovenia
A 24-player roster was announced on 2 April 2017. The final roster was revealed on 1 May 2017.

Head coach: Nik Zupančič

Switzerland
A 24-player roster was announced on 15 April 2017. A new 29-player roster was revealed on 22 April 2017. The final roster was set on 2 May 2017.

Head coach: Patrick Fischer

References

Rosters
IIHF World Championship rosters